María Elena Arpón (born 1948) is a Spanish actress.

She played Virginia in the Spanish horror film La noche del terror ciego (1972), directed by Amando de Ossorio and starring Lone Fleming and César Burner.

Filmography

References

External links
 

1948 births
20th-century Spanish actresses
Spanish television actresses
Spanish film actresses
Actresses from Madrid
Living people